Anúna (stylized in all caps) is a vocal ensemble formed in Ireland in 1987 by Irish composer Michael McGlynn under the name An Uaithne.  Taking the current name in 1991, the group has recorded 18 albums and achieved a high level of international success, including a significant role in Riverdance from 1994 to 1996. Almost all of their repertoire is composed or arranged by McGlynn. Having had a public base, and trained many singers, in Ireland, the group announced in December 2022 that they would cease public performance in Ireland, while continuing in Northern Ireland and beyond.

Musical style

The original name of the group, An Uaithne, "is the collective description for the three ancient forms of Irish music[...] the Goltraí (song of lament), Geantraí  (song of joy) and Suantraí (the lullaby)". McGlynn reconstructed and arranged a substantial amount of early and medieval Irish music, as well as writing original pieces. Anúna do not work with a conductor in performance, and move throughout the venue at different points in concert. Their standard line-up is 12 to 14 singers from a pool of 25 to 30.

McGlynn has stated: "My interest in traditional song stemmed from my schooldays in Coláiste na Rinne (Ring College) in Dungarvan, and I also felt a need to explore and communicate my enthusiasm for medieval music, most particularly Irish medieval music, to the general public. The eclectic repertoire that characterises the music of Anúna was born in this way". McGlynn re-set and rearranged historical texts and reconstructions of medieval Irish music. These included the 12th century pieces "Dicant Nunc" and "Cormacus Scripsit", both of which come from Irish manuscripts and featured in the repertoire of An Uaithne. Other reconstructions including  "Miserere Miseris" from the Dublin Troper and "Quem Queritis" from The Dublin Play continue to feature in the repertoire of Anúna. McGlynn has said: "I think that one of the purposes of Anúna has been to open the door of obscurity to some of the many medieval pieces that we've recorded".

An Uaithne featured a number of traditional music arrangements done by McGlynn as part of their repertoire. He has stated: "One of the misapprehensions about my music is that I am not actually concerned with saving Irish traditional music; I am not a traditionalist. The only exposure I had [to traditional Irish song] was during my year at Coláiste na Rinne in Dún Garbhán. The songs that I set are not from a specific collection; they are more impressions of the songs I remembered." McGlynn also created new compositions that could be perceived as arrangements of Irish songs but were, in fact, new melodies composed to traditional texts. These works are not arrangements and they became a feature of An Uaithne's repertoire and continue to be part of the Anúna canon. McGlynn has stated: "People just assume that I have just found a “living” version. In fact I have done what has made solo traditional music so viable: I have created a new version. I take the songs and reinterpret them in a new way. My priority is always to create a choral version that works."

According to Stephen Eddins at AllMusic, "[...] with the intent that it would unite the discipline of classical choral singing with the unaffected spontaneity typical of Irish folk singing." McGlynn supports this in his blog:
I can now hear two types of singer on the recording. There are large, plummy voices favoured by the classically trained singers I had gathered around me for An Uaithne, but now I can hear the “others” – early music singers, traditional singers and untrained singers. There is a fight going on. The performances are rough, but hugely energetic. Many of the more classical singers or choral groupies are stuck to the inadequately learned sheet music, while the new people are singing without music and without affectation.

The genesis of the choir's vocal sound derives from a number of different sources including Le Mystère des Voix Bulgares, although he has stated that Anúna are not an expression of their culture in the same way as the Bulgarian choir because, when creating Anúna, there was no point in his pretending that there had been a culture of part-singing in Ireland. McGlynn has stated: "What I have done is to try to always create an accessibility using the concept of fragility in the voice to allow the audience to access music that otherwise they might find overtly and harmonically complex or technically demanding to listen to."

Once a group of classically-trained singers, Anúna in the early 1990s began to include untrained singers with experience in non-classical music genres thus achieving the more natural timbre that McGlynn was seeking. "This is the 'Anúna' sound – powerful and fragile, immediate and human. When I developed it, it was almost as a protest against the artificial nature of choral groups I had been part of, where singers appeared to sing for themselves, never as a genuine unit and never for the audience."

The vocal timbre of the group has changed over the last thirty years according to McGlynn, "In 1994 Anúna was embryonic and restrained by the capacity of the singers to actually perform the material. I wrote for the instrument I had available to me, and the material both suffers and benefits from this restriction. Today I don’t have those same restrictions, with members drawn from all over the world. Anúna now contains some of the finest choral singers on the planet, so I am gradually becoming used to the idea that I can stretch my voice as a writer considerably more than in the past."

The ensemble works on a project to project basis and draws from a pool of available singers who are located in many countries. The performers use specific performance techniques collectively titled the "Anúna Technique".

History

An Uaithne 
McGlynn formed the choir An Uaithne in 1987, after involvement with college choirs at both University College Dublin and Trinity College Dublin, and the semi-professional RTE Chamber Choir.  Founder members included  Monica Donlon, and opera singer Miriam Blennerhassett from Howth, both of whom he had met at UCD, and Garrath Patterson.  The choir's earliest concerts featured medieval Irish and European music, contemporary choral pieces by Irish composers and Irish folk arrangements.

In 1991, An Uaithne officially became Anúna, a simplified phonetic rendition of the Irish an uaithne proposed by Monica Donlon's mother, Paula Donlon. In 1993, they released their disc ANÚNA, a sixteen-track CD followed, in 1994, by the album Invocation. Both albums were licensed by the Irish label Celtic Heartbeat and released in 1995  The album Anúna achieved a Billboard World Music chart placing at number 11 in 1995.

Anúna was associated with Riverdance from 1994 until 1996. They gave the first performance of the piece at the Eurovision Song Contest, spending 18 weeks at number 1 in the Irish singles chart and reaching number 9 in the UK singles chart. They featured on the CD Riverdance: Music from the Show and on the DVD Riverdance: the Show. They sang the opening choral section entitled "Cloudsong" with a solo by soprano Katie McMahon.

Anúna won an Irish National Entertainment Award for Classical music in 1994. In 1995, they released Omnis, followed by Deep Dead Blue in 1996. The latter gained an international release on the Gimell/Polygram label in 1999 and was nominated for a Classical Brit Award in 2000. The group left Riverdance in 1996. Anúna soprano Eimear Quinn won the Eurovision Song Contest in the same year in Oslo.

In 1997 Anúna released the CD Behind the Closed Eye, an orchestral collaboration with the Ulster Orchestra, Northern Ireland's leading symphony orchestra. The choir appeared at the World Sacred Music Festival in Morocco in 1998 (returning in 2002). In 1999 Anúna performed at the first ever Irish Prom at the BBC Proms in the Royal Albert Hall in London.

2000–2009
2000 saw the release of Cynara followed by Winter Songs (US Release title Christmas Songs) in 2002. The same year the group appeared at the "Proms in the Park" in Belfast, an open-air concert featuring The Ulster Orchestra in the grounds of Belfast's City Hall.

Their album Sensation, released in April 2006, was an eclectic collection, with settings by McGlynn of texts by Cardinal Henry Newman, Arthur Rimbaud and Hildegard von Bingen. The title track featured a spoken recitation of the Rimbaud poem "Sensation" by the Breton singer Gilles Servat. In January 2007, Anúna recorded a series of live performances in Cleveland which have been broadcast extensively on PBS across the US in a "special" produced by The Elevation Group and Maryland Public Television. The group undertook a two-month tour of the US in Autumn 2007. The album Anúna: Celtic Origins was released in the same year. It was the number one selling album in the World Music category of Nielsen Soundscan in August of that year.  November 2008 saw the release in the US of Christmas Memories, a CD and DVD release coupled with PBS Broadcasts nationally in November and December. The album entered the Billboard World Music Charts at number 6 on first week of release and spent 10 weeks in the Billboard World Music top 20 albums. The single "Ding Dong Merrily on High" reached number 26 on the Billboard "Hot Adult Contemporary Tracks" chart in December 2008.

In June 2009, Anúna released the CD Sanctus and DVD Invocations of Ireland. Sanctus featured four previously released tracks that have been remastered and in the case of one track, "Nobilis Humilis", have had parts re-recorded and added to the original song. Also featured are McGlynn's "Agnus Dei", Miserere mei, Deus by Gregorio Allegri and Crucifixus by Antonio Lotti. Invocations of Ireland was a 56-minute DVD filmed throughout Ireland by Michael McGlynn, and featured the music of Anúna sung in the Irish landscape. The DVD was released on Columbia in Japan and was broadcast extensively on the Ovation Channel in Australia and New Zealand.

In July 2009, Anúna gave the first performance of Behind the Closed Eye in the Republic of Ireland at Dublin's National Concert Hall with the RTÉ National Symphony Orchestra of Ireland

2010–2022
In 2010, Anúna adopted the name "Anúna, Ireland's National Choir" as their official title and inaugurated an Education and Outreach programme. The group performed again with the RTÉ National Symphony Orchestra of Ireland in July 2010, with Finnish violinist Linda Lampenius. The programme included a number of new pieces and arrangements including the nine-minute McGlynn fantasia based on the songs of Thomas Moore, "The Last Rose".

In June 2010, Anúna collaborated on a new CD and DVD project with The Wiggles, entitled It's Always Christmas With You! and released in 2011. In September 2010, Anúna recorded an arrangement by Michael McGlynn of "Away in a Manger" with ex-Celtic Woman soloist Órla Fallon for her Christmas PBS special, which also featured David Archuleta and another ex-Anúna and Celtic Woman soloist Méav Ní Mhaolchatha. The special was filmed in Dublin, Ireland. No fewer than five of the soloists who have been featured on Celtic Woman since 2005 (Órla Fallon, Méav Ní Mhaolchatha, Lynn Hilary, Éabha McMahon, Tara McNeill and Deirdre Shannon) have been members of Anúna.

On 27–29 January 2011, Anúna joined Irish musical pioneers Clannad for three concerts at Dublin's Christ Church Cathedral for the Donegal group's fortieth anniversary celebrations. They collaborated on five tracks, "Dúlamán", "Caislean Óir", "Theme from Harry's Game", "In a Lifetime" and "I Will Find You". Anúna also performed a version of "Media Vita" as they came onstage, integrating musical elements of "Caislean Óir".

Anúna made their Chinese debut in June 2011 touring a number of cities. In Beijing they performed at the Beijing Poly Theater and in Shanghai at the Shanghai Oriental Art Center. In July 2011 the National Concert Hall in Dublin presented the first Anúna International Summer School. The event took place between 5 and 9 July, and featured a team of international facilitators including Matthew Oltman, then musical director of Chanticleer. In September their album Christmas Memories débuted at 95 in The Billboard 200.  To finish the year, Anúna visited Japan, a trip which included concerts and workshops. This tour also included a high-profile visit to the area affected by the tsunami of 2011 and Fukushima. In April 2012, Anúna participated in the premiere of Philip Hammond's Requiem for the Lost Souls of the Titanic at St Anne's Cathedral, Belfast.

To celebrate their 25th anniversary in June 2012 Anúna released their new album Illumination, a fifteen track CD and, in May, featured on the soundtrack to the video game Diablo III. Blizzard Entertainment's audio director, Russell Brower says "Working somewhat against conventional expectations, Hell is a beautiful and seductive sound, provided by Dublin’s uniquely astounding choral group ANÚNA". As of February 2014, the game has sold 15 million copies across all platforms. In October, the choir gave a workshop at the Shanghai Conservatory and, in November, they hosted a series of public choral workshop events across the Netherlands. 2013 marked the first concert performances and workshops in Canada for the group. In 2015 Anúna sold-out Beijing's National Centre for the Performing Arts.

In 2017, as part of their 30th Anniversary year, Anúna performed as part of a collaborative project entitled "Takahime", in front of a sold-out audience on February 16 at Tokyo's Orchard Hall. It included a performance of Yokomichi Mario's adaptation of W.B. Yeats "At the Hawk's Well" entitled "Takahime", directed and scored by McGlynn and Gensho Umewaka (a Japanese National Treasure), who said of the collaboration with Anúna, “I think Celtic choral music and Noh are similar in both being abstract arts...So we have no need to hesitate and can just make all the creative sparks we wish." The performance featured a full cast of Noh actors and musicians, with Umewaka in the role of The Hawk.

On July 30, 2017 the choir performed at the Francis Ledwidge memorial event at Richmond Barracks in Dublin, with McGlynn commenting "When I discovered Ledwidge for the first time through the academic work of Inchicore poet Liam O'Meara, it was like finding a kindred spirit" and "Over the last two decades I have taken his poetry around the world as Anúna has toured. Each new setting I make of his texts yields more and more layers of meaning, more subtlety and nuance.  ... Ledwidge remains one of my greatest poetic inspirations."

In November 2017 Anúna released a video, created by Michael McGlynn, of the piece "Shadow of the Lowlands" composed by Yasunori Mitsuda. Speaking of his first encounter with Anúna through their album "Deep Dead Blue", Mitsuda says  "I felt that ANÚNA was a new type of chorus that I’d never heard before. My attention was drawn to the lead singer, Michael McGlynn, and I dreamt about making music with ANÚNA one day. After 20 years, my dream came true through the making of the game Xenoblade Chronicles 2". "Shadow of the Lowlands" is one of four that features on the soundtrack of the Nintendo Switch video game Xenoblade Chronicles 2. In February 2018 the group won the Outstanding Ensemble category of the Annual Game Music Awards 2017 for their contributions to the game. In April Anúna joined Mitsuda on stage in April for a series of full concert performances of music from Xenogears to celebrate the 20th anniversary of the release of the video game.

In November 2022, the group released a digital-only Christmas-themed album, recorded in Dublin. In December 2022, the group's leader announced that a pair of performances on December 3 would be their final public performances in Ireland, saying "After 35 years it has become increasingly apparent that ANÚNA doesn’t have a place within the Irish music community."  He further stated that the group would "continue to perform in Nth Ireland and in a private capacity at home" as well as touring internationally.

Members / performers

Selected current members
Miriam Blennerhassett is an Irish mezzo-soprano, and is the current Chorus Master of Anúna, also featuring as a soloist on CD, DVD and in performance. She features as a soloist on the albums Omnis, Invocation, Sensation, Deep Dead Blue, Celtic Origins and Behind the Closed Eye. She appears as a soloist on the  Invocations of Ireland and Celtic Origins. Blennerhassett is a founder member of Anúna.

Lucy Champion is an English singer. She currently holds the position Education Co-ordinator with Anúna and is a featured soprano soloist with the choir. She appears as a soloist on the albums Christmas Songs, Invocation, Sensation, Anúna, Sanctus, Cynara, Deep Dead Blue, Christmas Memories, Celtic Origins and Behind the Closed Eye. She appears as a soloist on the DVDs Invocations of Ireland and Celtic Origins. She was Concerts and Events Manager for The Ulster Orchestra in Belfast, Administrator and Education Manager for the Wren Orchestra in London, Education Manager with the National Concert Hall in Dublin and is currently a choral clinician and educator, most recently giving a series of workshops at Dublin's National Concert Hall in 2009/2010.

John McGlynn is a tenor with Anúna and an Irish singer-songwriter. He is also Michael McGlynn's identical twin brother. His distinctive guitar style features on many of Anúna's albums. Originally an architect by trade, he currently acts as a director of the choir, touring in that capacity throughout Europe and the US. He released his solo album Songs For A Fallen Angel in 2000 and has formed a trio entitled Sweet June. His arrangements and original songs appear on a number of Anúna releases. "If All She Has Is You" appears on the Celtic Origins album and concert DVD and has been covered by Celtic Woman soloist Lynn Hilary on her debut solo album. Other arrangements and original pieces include "The Fisher King", "Buachaill ón Éirne", "Siúil a Rúin" and "O Come All Ye Faithful". He features as a soloist on the albums Christmas Songs, Invocation, Anúna, Deep Dead Blue, Christmas Memories, Celtic Origins and Cynara. He appears as a soloist on the DVDs Invocations of Ireland, Celtic Origins and Christmas Memories.

Selected past members
A number of singers who have left the choir have gone on to achieve international recognition in their own right:
Eimear Quinn, a soprano, was a member in 1995 and 1996, and won the Eurovision Song Contest in 1996 while a member. She has recorded numerous solos with the choir, including "The Mermaid", "Diwanit Bugale", "The Green Laurel", "Gaudete" and "Salve Rex Gloriae". She appears on the albums Omnis and Deep Dead Blue.
Ian King, a British songwriter working in the English folk music genre, was a tenor with Anúna from 1996 to 1997. His debut album, Panic Grass and Fever Few gained four-star reviews in the Guardian and Observer newspapers in the UK, and he was featured on the 2009 thirtieth anniversary cover of the influential fRoots magazine.
Julie Feeney is a successful solo female artist and she sang alto with Anúna from 1997 to 2001. 
Hozier, also known as Andrew Hozier-Byrne, was a member of Anúna from 2009 to 2012, and appears as a soloist on their 2012 release Illumination singing "La Chanson de Mardi Gras". He toured and sang with the group internationally including performances in Norway and the Netherlands.

Some of the singers who have featured as soloists in Celtic Woman are ex-members of the group:
Méav Ní Mhaolchatha is a soprano recording artist, who was a member of the choir between 1994 and 1998. She has recorded numerous solos with the choir, including "Midnight", "The Lass of Glenshee", "Geantraí", "When I was in My Prime" and "The Mermaid". She appears on the albums Omnis, Deep Dead Blue and Behind the Closed Eye.
Órla Fallon is a solo recording artist traditional music who was a member of Anúna in 1996. In 2010, her PBS Christmas Special "Órla Fallon's Celtic Christmas", also released as a CD and DVD, features Anúna on the track "Away in a Manger" performing with her.
Deirdre Shannon began her professional career in 1996 when she became a member of Anúna and features as a soloist on the original album release of "Behind the Closed Eye" as a soloist on the track "1901".
Lynn Hilary was a member of Anúna between 2000 and 2007. She has recorded numerous solos with the choir, including "Midnight", "Codhlaím go Suan", "The Last Rose", "The Road of Passage" and "Annaghdown". She appears on the albums Christmas Songs, Invocation, Sensation and Behind the Closed Eye. In 2012 she featured as a soloist on two tracks, "Siosuram So" and "Summer Song" from the Anúna album Illumination (2012). She also features as a soloist on the Anúna album Revelation (2015).
Éabha McMahon is a sean nós singer and joined Celtic Woman in 2015. She features as a soloist on two Anúna albums "Christmas Memories" (2008) and "Revelation" (2015).
Tara McNeill sang with Anúna from 2010 to 2016 and joined Celtic Woman in 2016 as featured violinist in the show.

Discography

Albums and DVD releases
The group has released many albums and several DVDs since 1991:

+ Both albums amalgamated into a single, remastered release in 2003
++ Indicates a compilation

Recorded collaborations
 With Barry Manilow – Thumbelina (1993)
 With The Chieftains and Sting – "Mo Ghile Mear" from the album The Long Black Veil (1994)
 With the RTÉ Concert Orchestra, Davy Spillane (Uilleann pipes), Kenneth Edge (Saxophone), Máire Breathnach (violin), Noel Eccles (percussion) – Riverdance (1994)
 Riverdance: Music from the Show (1995)
 With the Ulster Orchestra – Behind the Closed Eye (1997)
 With The Chieftains and Elvis Costello – "Long Journey Home", title track of the album Long Journey Home (1998)
 With The Chieftains and Dadawa – "Tear Lake" from Tears of Stone (1999), Japan only
 With The Chieftains and Brenda Fricker – "Never Give All The Heart", from Tears of Stone (1999)
 With Secret Garden – "I Know a Rose Tree". Also appear on their albums: Dawn of a New Century (1999), Once in a Red Moon (2002), and the DVD: A Night with Secret Garden (2000)
 With Ashley MacIsaac – "The Wedding Funeral" from the album Ashley MacIsaac (2002)
 With Jerry Fish and the Mudbug Club – "Be Yourself", "True Friends", "Bob & God" from the album Be Yourself (2002)
 With Moya Brennan and Iarla Ó Lionaird – "Is Mise 'N Gaoth" (2010) from the CD Music of Ireland: Welcome home
 With Órla Fallon – "Away in a Manger" from Orla Fallon's Celtic Christmas (2010)
 With The Wiggles – "The Cherry Tree Carol", "The Little Drummer Boy", "Ding Dong Merrily on High" & "We Three Kings", from the CD and DVD It's Always Christmas With You! (2011).
 With Yasunori Mitsuda – Xenogears Original Soundtrack Revival Disc –the first and the last– (2018).

References

External links
 Official website
 Michael McGlynn's official website
 interview with Michael McGlynn, Choralnet US

Chamber choirs
Irish choirs
Musical groups established in 1987